Houston Rodeo Live is a live album released by Jennifer Peña on November 2, 2004  it was recorded on March 14, 2004 at the Houston Livestock Show & Rodeo in  Houston, Texas in front of a crowd of 50,000 spectators. The album was made available in both CD and CD/DVD combo, it sold 100,000 units, becoming Pena's seventh Platinum certified album by the RIAA. A bestseller in spite of never having an official single, early TV slots promoted a duet with  Obie Bermúdez "No Se Nada De Ti" which was later scrapped off the track list. Instead it only featured one unreleased song Por Amor and a dozen of Jennifer hits "Si Tu Te Vas", Contigo Otra Vez and  El Dolor De Tu Presencia in live format recorded before the release of her sixth effort Seducción; it also included "Vivo Y Muero En Tu Piel".

Track listing

Sales and certifications

References

External links 

 http://www.univision.net/corp/en/pr/Woodland_Hills_05112004-1.html

2004 live albums
Jennifer Peña live albums
2004 video albums
Live video albums